Zaaihoek Dam is a gravity type dam located on the Slang River in Kwazulu-Natal Province of South Africa. The dam, which has a 185,000,000 m3 capacity, was built in 1988. The dam primarily provides water for industrial and municipal uses. Its hazard potential has been ranked high (3). It is 39.45 km(24.5 mi) long. It is somewhat known for fishing.

See also
List of reservoirs and dams in South Africa

References

General references
 List of South African Dams from the Department of Water Affairs and Forestry (South Africa)

Dams in South Africa
Dams completed in 1988